Kao Yu-ting (born 28 March 1985) is a Taiwanese engineer and politician. She joined the New Power Party in 2015, served as party leader from August to November 2020.

Early life and career
Kao was born on 28 March 1985 in Taipei County and was raised in Taipei. She attended , then enrolled at the National Huwei Institute of Technology, within the department of aeronautical engineering. Kao subsequently completed a master's degree in electrical engineering at the National Taiwan University of Science and Technology. Prior to her political career, Kao worked at the Industrial Technology Research Institute.

Political career
Kao joined the New Power Party in 2015, and contested the Hsinchu City Constituency seat on the Legislative Yuan on the party's behalf in 2020. Her unsuccessful legislative campaign was backed by Wu Nien-jen. Following the mass resignation of acting chair Chiu Hsien-chih and all members of the New Power Party's executive council on 5 August 2020, Kao was elected to the body with the second highest vote share, trailing only Claire Wang, and assumed the party leadership with the council's support on 29 August 2020. Kao announced her intention to resign as chair on 3 November 2020. Kao stated that her resignation as chair and from the executive council would take effect upon the inauguration of a new chair. Kao said that she assumed leadership of the party to help the party reform its operations, and resigned because the objective had been achieved. She felt pressured to begin planning for the 2022 elections, but believed that the task was better left to her successor. Kao was replaced by Chen Jiau-hua on 10 November 2020.

Personal life
Kao has two daughters.

References

1985 births
Living people
Taiwanese women engineers
National Formosa University alumni
National Taiwan University of Science and Technology alumni
Politicians of the Republic of China on Taiwan from Hsinchu
Politicians of the Republic of China on Taiwan from New Taipei
Politicians of the Republic of China on Taiwan from Taipei
New Power Party chairpersons
21st-century women engineers
21st-century Taiwanese women politicians
21st-century Taiwanese politicians